Take the World by Storm is the debut studio album by the American glam metal band Slave Raider, released independently in 1986. In December 1987, the album was remixed and released to the public in 1988 through the Jive record label, suffering poor sales. The band did have a cult following in Minneapolis. The remixed Make Some Noise was released as a single and a promotional video was shot in The Twin Cities. In the remix, Make Some Noise was cut by around a minute and The Black Hole has a longer introduction.  It was available scarcely on CD, cassette, and vinyl and was out of print until Divebomb Records reissued it and the band's sophomore release What Do You Know About Rock 'N Roll? in April 2015.

Track listing

Staff
 Lead vocals - Chainsaw Caine (Mike Findling)
 Bass guitar/backing vocals - Letitia Rae
 Acoustic and electronic percussion - The Rock (Michael T Williams)
 Lead and rhythm guitar - Lance Sabin
 Lead and rhythm guitar/backing vocals - Nicci Wikkid (David Hussman)
 Keyboards - Lee Blaske
 Engineers - Tom Tucker, John Hurst, Kirby Binder
 Assistant engineers - John Hurst, Brad Lobash, Tom Tucker Jr., Tom Herbers, Julie Gardeski
 Remix - Chris Tsangarides
 Remix assistant - Mark Flannery
 Mixing engineer - Tom Tucker
 Front cover photography - Thomas Lowe, Kit Rogers
 Skull illustration - Van Bro
 Album design - John Hanson, MCMG, Van Bro

References

1986 albums
Slave Raider albums